Dovilė Kilty (née Dzindzaletaitė; born 14 July 1993) is a Lithuanian track and field athlete who competes as long and triple jumper. Her personal best triple jump record and former national record for Lithuania is 14.17 metres, reached at the 2012 World Junior Championships in Athletics. Her personal best long jump record is 6.08 metres, reached at the 2012 Šiauliai city championship.

Kilty was born in Šiauliai.  She represented Lithuania in the 2010 Summer Youth Olympics in Singapore.

Personal life 
Kilty has been married to British sprinter Richard Kilty since 2017, whom she met in London during the IAAF Diamond League meeting. Together they have a son, Richard Jr. Due to her pregnancy, Kilty had to miss the 2016 Olympics.

International competitions

National competitions

References

External links

1993 births
Living people
Sportspeople from Šiauliai
Lithuanian female triple jumpers
Lithuanian female long jumpers
Athletes (track and field) at the 2010 Summer Youth Olympics
World Athletics Championships athletes for Lithuania